Tabiteuea North Airport  is the airport serving the northern part of Tabiteuea.

The airport is served twice a week by Air Kiribati from Bonriki, on Tarawa. 
It is the hub that serves the southern Gilbert Islands, like Onotoa Airport, Tamana Airport or Arorae Airport.

Airlines and destinations

References

External links 
 Direct flights from Tabiteuea (TBF) - FlightConnections

Airports in Kiribati
Gilbert Islands